Chambers v. Florida, 309 U.S. 227 (1940), was a landmark United States Supreme Court case that dealt with the extent to which police pressure resulting in a criminal defendant's confession violates the Due Process Clause.

Case 
The case was argued on January 6, 1940, in front of the court by Thurgood Marshall (who was 31 years old at the time), representing four black men convicted for the murder of a white man in Florida. 

The defendant Chambers, along with three other co-defendants, were four of up to forty transient black men arrested for the murder of Robert Darcy, an elderly local man, in Pompano Beach, Florida. The community was outraged by the murder, and the Broward County Sheriff's department was apparently under pressure to close the case. Chambers and the other defendants were taken to Miami for questioning, ostensibly to protect them from the mob that had formed, and then to Fort Lauderdale.

The state did not contest that the defendants were held without access to legal counsel, and were not arraigned for a week. They were subjected to questioning on a random basis, often alone in a room with up to ten police officers and other members of the community. In the legal climate before Miranda, they were not informed of their right to remain silent. After a week of questioning, and despite previous denials, the four co-defendants eventually confessed to the crime and were convicted of capital murder and sentenced to death. Their convictions were affirmed by the Supreme Court of Florida.

Decision
On February 13, 1940, the court delivered its ruling. The opinion of the court was delivered by Justice Hugo Black of Alabama.

This was Marshall's first of many triumphs in front of the nation's highest tribunal; the Court ruled in favor of the defendants, and overturned their convictions. The court found that on the facts admitted by the police and sheriff's officers, the confessions had clearly been compelled and were therefore inadmissible. It marked one of the first times that the court had accepted the contention that treatment short of physical violence should result in the suppression of evidence.

Several of the features of this case, such as not allowing defendants to contact anyone, holding them without formal charges or arraignment, and denying them counsel during questioning were common tactics in law enforcement at the time and were eventually rejected by the court in Miranda v. Arizona (1966), a case in which Marshall argued on behalf of the United States government as Solicitor General of the United States.

Aftermath
In subsequent proceedings before the Florida courts, the indictment against the defendants was quashed on the ground that blacks had been arbitrarily and intentionally excluded from the grand jury.

See also
 Brown v. Mississippi (1936)
 List of United States Supreme Court cases

References

External links
 
 

1940 in United States case law
Civil rights movement case law
United States Supreme Court cases of the Hughes Court
United States Fifth Amendment self-incrimination case law
Pompano Beach, Florida
United States Supreme Court cases